Mark Hartigan (born 10 November 1955) is an Irish modern pentathlete. He competed at the 1980 Summer Olympics, finishing last in the individual event in 43rd place.

References

External links
 

1955 births
Living people
Irish male modern pentathletes
Olympic modern pentathletes of Ireland
Modern pentathletes at the 1980 Summer Olympics